Ali Akbar Alizad (born 1973) is a theater director in Iran. He was most acclaimed for his performance of Waiting for Godot (2006)

Alizad has been a member of Aein theater group and Leev theater group for 10 years, and in 2006 he began to found his theatrical group named 84theater.

Professional history
Ali Akbar Alizad is a lecturer at the Cinema & Theater College, University of Art (2004-present), teaching drama analysis, playwriting, and dramatic principles.

He began his journey in the theater since 1991, where at the time, his central interest focused on directing. Ali Akbar Alizad has many experiences in other parts of theatrical work such as writing and acting. He was also a member of Aeein Theater Group from 1991 to 2004 and Member of Leev Theater Group from 2004. In the late 2006, he discovered 84theater as he explored into different parts of the theatre world. In 2012 TDR, The Drama Review, has published an essay about an Iranian new theater and Beckett/Pinter that was written by Alizad. In 2009, He met Noel Greig in Tehran to hold a workshop where Alizad translated his book; Playwriting: A Practical Guide, into Persian.

Theater works 2005-2009
Waiting for Godot by Samuel Beckett, Tehran, Molavi Hall (2005)
Two Latin American plays, Tehran, Department of Cinema & Theater (2006)
Oleanna by David Mamet, Tehran, City Theater (2006)
Anniversary Celebratory and Swan Song by Chekhov, Tehran, Department of Cinema & Theater (2007)
Ohio Impromptu, Footfalls, Come and Go, Catastrophe, and Rough for Theater 1 by Samuel Beckett (Tehran, Molavi Hall, June 2008)
All That Falls by Samuel Beckett, Artist home, Tehran, September 2008
Police by Slawomir Merozek, first premier: May 2009

Theater works 2009-2013 
Catastrophe & Come and Go by Samuel Beckett, Romania, 2009
What Where / Mountain Language Beckett/Pinter, (2010)Magic Mountain, written and devised by Ali Akbar Alizad (2010), collaboration between 84theater and 20 Stories High from Liverpool, performed in Manchester, UK, as a part of Contacting the World FestivalCatastrophe and Come and Go by Samuel Beckett, UK, Manchester, 2010Endless Monologue, a documentary performance, on the basis of verbatim technique. July 2011, East Gallery, TehranPlay by Samuel Beckett, Arasbaran Art Center, Tehran, November and September 2011.Krapp's Last Tape, by Samuel Beckett, Molavi Hall, 2012Tango, by Slawomir Merozek, (banned by Iranian Art censorship)

 Theater Works 2014-2015 The House of Bernarda Alba by Lorca, Tehran, 2014Act Without Words I & II by Samuel Beckett, Tehran, Moje No hall, 2014Oleanna'' by David Mamet, Tehran, Samandarian hall, 2015

References

Iranian male stage actors
Iranian theatre directors
Living people
1973 births